The 2017 WNBA season was the 10th season for the Atlanta Dream of the Women's National Basketball Association. The team began its season on May 21, 2017 against the Chicago Sky, in its new interim home of McCamish Pavilion on the Georgia Tech campus. The Dream had a strong start to the season posting a 4–1 record in May.  However, the team finished 1–6 in June, falling under .500.  The team couldn't recover its form for the rest of the season finishing a combined 7–15 in the last three months of the season.  Their final record of 12–22 placed them 5th in the Eastern Conference, and failed to qualify the team for the playoffs.

Transactions

WNBA Draft

Trades and Roster Changes

Roster
{| class="toccolours" style="font-size: 95%; width: 100%;"
|-
! colspan="2" style="background:#6495ED;color:white;"|2017 Atlanta Dream Roster
|- style="text-align:center; background-color:#FF0000; color:#FFFFFF;"
! Players !! Coaches
|- 
| valign="top" |
{| class="sortable" style="background:transparent; margin:0px; width:100%;"
! Pos. !! # !! Nat. !! Name !! Ht. !! Wt. !! From
|-

Depth

Schedule

Preseason

|- bgcolor="ffcccc"
| 1 || May 5 || Minnesota || L 67-113  || Holmes (13) || Tied (5) || Sykes (4) || Xcel Energy Center5,132 || 0-1
|-

Regular season

|- style="background:#bbffbb;"
| 1 || May 13 || Connecticut || W 81–74 || Hayes (19) || Williams (9) || Tied (3) || Mohegan Sun Arena6,444 || 1-0
|- style="background:#bbffbb;"
| 2 || May 19 || Chicago || W 91-83 || Hayes (23) || Williams (11) || Clarendon (11) || Allstate Arena  6,631 || 2-0 
|- style="background:#fcc;"
| 3 || May 21 || Chicago || L 75-71 || Tied (17) || Williams (13) || Clarendon (9) || McCamish Pavilion  4,859 || 2-1 
|- style="background:#bbffbb;"
| 4 || May 27 || Los Angeles || W 75-73 || Hayes (24) || Williams (9) || Clarendon (12) || McCamish Pavilion  4,253 || 3-1 
|- style="background:#bbffbb;"
| 5 || May 31 || San Antonio || W 77-70 || Hayes (16) || Williams (9) || Clarendon (8) || McCamish Pavilion  3,813 || 4-1

|- style="background:#fcc;"
| 6 || June 4 || Washington || L 72–78 || Hayes (24) || Williams (9) || Tied (9) || Verizon Center5,320 || 4-2
|- style="background:#fcc;"
| 7 || June 7 || New York || L 61-76 || Tied (14) || Lyttle (12) || Tied (3) || Madison Square Garden14,816 || 4-3
|- style="background:#fcc;"
| 8 || June 10 || Connecticut || L 71-104 || Dantas (16) || Williams (9) || Clarendon (4) || Mohegan Sun Arena5,327 || 4-4
|- style="background:#bbffbb;"
| 9 || June 13 || Seattle || W 91-86 || Dantas (22) || Clarendon (8) || Clarendon (6) || KeyArena  4,352 || 5-4
|- style="background:#fcc;"
| 10 || June 15 || Indiana || L 74-85 || Tied (17) || Dantas (8) || Clarendon (8) || Bankers Life Fieldhouse  5,830 || 5-5
|- style="background:#fcc;"
| 11 || June 23 || Chicago || L 78-82 || Williams (20) || Williams (10) || Clarendon (5) || McCamish Pavilion  4,237 || 5-6
|- style="background:#fcc;"
| 12 || June 30 || Los Angeles || L 76-85 ||  Hayes (18) || Tied (5) || Tied 6 || McCamish Pavilion  4,119 || 5-6

|- style="background:#bbffbb;"
| 13 || July 2 || New York || W 81-72 || Sykes (19) || Sykes (9) || Clarendon (9) ||McCamish Pavilion  3,521 || 6-7
|- style="background:#fcc;"
| 14 || July 5 || Dallas || L 84-94 || Hayes (16) || Dantas (9) || Clarendon (8) || College Park Center  3,555 || 6-8
|- style="background:#bbffbb;"
| 15 || July 7 || Indiana || W 89-68 || Clarendon (27) || Clarendon (8) || Clarendon (6) || McCamish Pavilion  3,359 || 7-8
|- style="background:#bbffbb;"
| 16 || July 9 || Dallas || W 98-78 || Hayes (19) || Sykes (8) || Clarendon (8) || McCamish Pavilion  4,019 || 8-8
|- style="background:#fcc;"
| 17 || July 12 || Phoenix || L 84-89 || Clarendon (21) || Williams (10) || Clarendon (10) || Talking Stick Resort Arena  9,342 || 8-9
|- style="background:#fcc;"
| 18 || July 15 || Seattle || L 84-90 || Hayes (19) || Dantas (9) || Clarendon (8) || KeyArena  6,993 || 8-10
|- style="background:#bbffbb;"
| 19 || July 18 || San Antonio || W 88-75 || Hayes (25) || Lyttle (10) || Clarendon (7) || McCamish Pavilion  7,413 || 9-10
|- style="background:#fcc;"
| 20 || July 19 || Washington || L 96-100 || Sykes (27) || Lyttle (11) || Clarendon (8) || Verizon Center  15,597 || 9-11
|- style="background:#bbffbb;"
| 21 || July 25 || Phoenix || W 99-91 || Sykes (20) || Sykes (13) || Clarendon (9) || McCamish Pavilion  4,053 || 10-11
|- style="background:#fcc;"
| 22 || July 28 || Minnesota || L 80-90 || Hayes (25) || Lyttle (6) || Clarendon (8) || McCamish Pavilion  4,197 || 10-12
|- style="background:#fcc;"
| 23 || July 30 || Washington || L 70-77 || Williams (18) || Lyttle (9) || Clarendon (10) || McCamish Pavilion  4,185 || 10-13

|- style="background:#fcc;"
| 24 || August 3 || Minnesota || L 54-69 || Clarendon (18) || Lyttle (11) || Clarendon (5) || Xcel Energy Center  9,622 || 10-14
|- style="background:#fcc;"
|25 || August 5 || Chicago || L 86-91 || Tied (13) || Williams (12) ||  Clarendon (5) || Allstate Arena  5,757 || 10-15
|- style="background:#fcc;"
| 26 || August 8 || Minnesota || L 72-81 || Williams (16) || Tied (11) || Holmes (5) || McCamish Pavilion  4,006 || 10-16
|- style="background:#fcc;"
| 27 || August 11 || New York || L 77-83 || Sykes (16) || Williams (6) || Clarendon (8) || McCamish Pavilion5,158 || 10-17
|- style="background:#fcc;"
| 28 || August 12 || San Antonio || L 66-84 || Sykes (28) || Young (6) || Clarendon (5) || AT&T Center6,953 || 10-18
|- style="background:#fcc;"
| 29 || August 15 || Connecticut || L 75-96 || Sykes (23) || Lyttle (9) || Clarendon (11) || McCamish Pavilion4,585 || 10-19
|- style="background:#fcc;"
| 30 || August 19 || Dallas || L 86-90 || Hayes (22) || Tied (7) || Ajavon (4) || College Park Center  4,962 || 10-20
|- style="background:#bbffbb;"
| 31 || August 23 || Seattle || W 89-83 || Lyttle (18) || Lyttle (8) || Clarendon (14) || McCamish Pavilion  4,878 || 11-20
|- style="background:#bbffbb;"
| 32 || August 26 || Indiana || W 79-74 || Hayes (24) || Williams (15) || Tied (4) || McCamish Pavilion5,029 || 12-20

|- style="background:#fcc;"
| 33 || September 1 || Los Angeles || L 56-81 || Hayes (19) || Williams (6) || Clarendon (2) || Staples Center12,163 || 12-21
|- style="background:#fcc;"
| 34 || September 3 || Phoenix || L 70-84 || Sykes (33) || Tied (5) || Tied (2) || Talking Stick Resort Arena11,222 || 12-22

Standings

Statistics

Regular Season

Awards and honors

References

External links
THE OFFICIAL SITE OF THE ATLANTA DREAM

Atlanta Dream seasons
Atlanta
Atlanta Dream